James Charles Heard (August 10, 1917 – September 27, 1988) was an American swing, bop, and blues drummer.

Biography 
Heard was born in Dayton, Ohio and was raised in Detroit, Michigan. As a young child, he performed as a tap dancer in amateur contests and vaudeville shows. Around the age of 11, Heard began to switch his focus to the drums. He started out teaching himself to play, then took lessons as a student at Cass Technical High School. His parents supported his interest, and brought him to see major performers who toured to Detroit's music venues. He would later describe seeing Chick Webb play in 1937 as a formative experience.

Heard became a protege of the drummer Jo Jones, and through him would meet and sit in with Count Basie. With Jones's help, Heard gained his first professional job with Teddy Wilson's band in 1939. They played the Golden Gate Ballroom in Harlem and the Roseland Ballroom, and recorded for Columbia. After the Wilson band's breakup, he went on to perform in bands led by Benny Carter, Louis Jordan, Louis Armstrong, Benny Goodman, Duke Ellington, Woody Herman, and Dizzy Gillespie. He also performed at major jazz festivals, and played alongside Roy Eldridge and Charlie Parker.

Heard's style was a hybrid of swing and bop. He was known for his innovative techniques and the hard swing he would bring to both large and small bands. He recorded with Charles Mingus, Ray Brown, Billie Holiday, Ray Charles, Nat King Cole, Dinah Washington, Lena Horne, and Sarah Vaughan. He also led his own bands, including a quintet that played at Café Society and a trio with Erroll Garner and Oscar Pettiford. Heard performed as a featured member of Cab Calloway's band from 1942-1945. As a member of the Calloway band, he appeared in several Hollywood films, including Stormy Weather (1943).

Heard toured with Norman Granz's Jazz at the Philharmonic in the 1950s. After a successful engagement in Japan in 1953, he remained in the country for several years to perform and teach. He became a mentor to young musicians like Izumi Yukimura, George Kawaguchi and Franky Sakai. He also met and married his wife Hiroko while living in Japan.

After returning to New York in 1957, Heard played with the Coleman Hawkins-Roy Eldridge Quintet and with Teddy Wilson's trio. In 1966, he moved to Detroit where he was a bandleader and a mentor to younger musicians. In 1983, he again recorded an album as leader, accompanied by saxophonist George Benson, pianist Claude Black, and Dave Young on bass. In 1981, Heard started a 13 piece big band which played around the state and at festivals, often featuring Dizzy Gillespie and other colleagues. This group recorded in 1986 and continued performing regularly until his death.

Heard died of a heart attack at the age of 71 in Royal Oak, Michigan. His legacy is honored with a yearly jazz drumming competition held as part of the Detroit Jazz Festival.

Discography

As leader/co-leader
1956: Calypso For Dancing (Philips (Australia))
1958: This is Me, J. C. Heard (Argo)
1964: Live At The Lighthouse 1964 (Fresh Sound) with Bill Perkins
1983: The Detroit Jazz Tradition - Alive & Well (Parkwood)
1986: Some of This, Some of That! - JC Heard Orchestra (Hiroko)
1988: Mr. B. with J.C. Heard - Partners in Time - with George Benson (Blind Pig Records)
1980s: J.C. Heard Featuring Charlie Gabriel and Friends (Gabriel Historical Society)

As sideman
With Toshiko Akiyoshi
Toshiko's Piano (Norgaran, 1953)
With Gene Ammons
Nice an' Cool (Moodsville, 1961)
Jug (Prestige, 1961)
With Shorty Baker and Doc Cheatham
Shorty & Doc (Swingville, 1961)
With Benny Carter
Cosmopolite (Norgran, 1952 [1955])
With Doc Cheatham
Hey Doc! (Black & Blue, 1975)
With Arnett Cobb
Sizzlin' (Prestige, 1960)
Ballads by Cobb (Moodsvile, 1960)
With Roy Eldridge
Rockin' Chair (Clef, 1951)
With Bud Freeman
The Bud Freeman All-Stars featuring Shorty Baker (Swingville, 1960) with Shorty Baker
With Dizzy Gillespie
Dizzy Gillespie and Stuff Smith (Verve, 1957)
Sittin' In (Verve, 1957)
With Al Grey
Al Grey Featuring Arnett Cobb (Black & Blue, 1977)
With Norman Granz
Norman Granz' Jam Session, #1 (Clef MGC 601) this and the following album features Benny Carter, Johnny Hodges, Charlie Parker, Ben Webster and others
Norman Granz' Jam Session, #2 (Clef MGC 602)
With Johnny Hodges
In a Tender Mood (Norgran, 1952 [1955])
The Blues (Norgran, 1952–54, [1955])
With Claude Hopkins
Let's Jam (Swingville, 1961) with Buddy Tate and Joe Thomas
With Illinois Jacquet
Illinois Jacquet Quartet (Storyville, 1978)
God Bless My Solo (Black & Blue, 1978)
With Ellis Larkins
A Smooth One (Black & Blue, 1977)
With Howard McGhee
Howard McGhee and Milt Jackson (Savoy, 1948 [1955])
With Oscar Peterson
JATP Lausanne 1953 (TCB 02152, 1953)
Lausanne 1953 (TCB 02162, 1953)
With Sammy Price
Fire (Black & Blue, 1975)
Rockin' Boogie (Black & Blue, 1975)
With Ike Quebec
 Ike Quebec 1944-1946 (Classics)
With Al Sears
Things Ain't What They Used to Be (Swingville, 1961) as part of the Prestige Swing Festival
With Sir Charles Thompson
Sir Charles Thompson And The Swing Organ (Columbia, 1959)
With Mary Lou Williams
The Zodiac Suite (Vintage Jazz Classics, 1945)
With Teddy Wilson
Piano Moods (Columbia, 1950) – majority of tracks
Soft Moods (Clef, 1953)
With John Wright
Nice 'n' Tasty (Prestige, 1961)
With Lester Young
Lester Young with the Oscar Peterson Trio (Norgran, 1952)

References

External links
See his early recordings on the Continental label at The Remington Site

1917 births
1988 deaths
Musicians from Dayton, Ohio
Swing drummers
Bebop drummers
American jazz drummers
Cass Technical High School alumni
American jazz bandleaders
20th-century American drummers
American male drummers
Jazz musicians from Ohio
20th-century American male musicians
American male jazz musicians
The Cab Calloway Orchestra members
Black & Blue Records artists